William David Grafton Loudon (born 22 May 1954) is a Scottish former cricketer.

Loudon was born at Lanark in May 1954. He was educated at the Edinburgh Academy. A club cricketer for Edinburgh Academical Cricket Club, he made his debut for Scotland in a List A one-day match against Yorkshire at Bradford in the 1981 Benson & Hedges Cup. After making a further one-day appearance in that competition, Loudon made a further four appearances in the 1982 Benson & Hedges Cup. In six one-day appearances for Scotland, he scored 78 runs with a highest score of 22, in addition to taking two wickets. Loudon appeared once in first-class cricket for Scotland against Ireland at Edinburgh in 1982. In Ireland's second innings he bowled 5.1 overs taking figures of 3 for 4.

Loudon was appointed Chairman of Selectors for Scotland in 2001. During his tenure, Scotland qualified for the 2007 World Cup, but toward the end of his tenure he drew criticism from Ian Stanger for Scotland's failure to qualify for the following World Cup, citing a lack of professionalism and the recruitment of South African-born players into the squad. Loudon left the post in February 2009 and was replaced as Chairman of Selectors by Iain Kennedy. Outside of cricket, Loudon is a stockbroker.

References

External links
 

1954 births
Living people
Sportspeople from Lanark
People educated at Edinburgh Academy
Scottish stockbrokers
Scottish cricketers
Scottish cricket administrators
Scotland national cricket team selectors